Gavin Kyle Green (born 28 December 1993) is a Malaysian professional golfer.

Amateur career
Green played college golf at the University of New Mexico where he won eight times and was a 3-time  All-American (3rd team 2013, 2nd team 2014, 1st team 2015) and 2-time Mountain West Conference golfer of the year.

Professional career
Green won three times on the Asian Development Tour, once in 2014 as an amateur and twice in 2016. He qualified for the 2016 Summer Olympics and finished in 47th place, and the 2020 Summer Olympics (tying for 57th place).

Green played on the Asian Tour in 2017. He was runner-up in the Hero Indian Open, the Yeangder Heritage and the Shinhan Donghae Open before winning the Mercuries Taiwan Masters and leading the Order of Merit.

Personal life
Green is of Portuguese, Irish and Chinese descent. His parents are Gary and Vivienne Green. His brother Galven Green played college golf at the University of New Mexico, where he also won the Mountain West Conference Individual Championship in 2019.

Amateur wins
2009 Perlis Amateur, Malaysian Amateur Closed, Kurnia Saujana Amateur, TSM Golf Challenge, Malaysian Junior Open
2010 Malaysian Amateur Closed, TSM Golf Challenge, Sabah International Junior Masters
2011 Kuala Lumpur Amateur, Malaysian Amateur Closed, Kurnia Saujana Championship
2012 Malaysian Amateur Open, Saujana Championship, William H Tucker
2013 Putra Cup, William H Tucker, Western Refining College All-American
2014 UTSA Lone Star Invitational, Mountain West Championship, William H Tucker, Western Refining College All-American
2015 Hootie at Bulls Bay Invitational

Source:

Professional wins (4)

Asian Tour wins (1)

Asian Development Tour wins (3)

1Co-sanctioned by the Professional Golf of Malaysia Tour
2Co-sanctioned by the Philippine Golf Tour

Results in major championships

"T" indicates a tie for a place

Results in World Golf Championships

"T" = Tied

Team appearances
Amateur
Eisenhower Trophy (representing Malaysia): 2012, 2014

Professional
EurAsia Cup (representing Asia): 2018
World Cup (representing Malaysia): 2018

References

External links

Malaysian male golfers
Asian Tour golfers
Olympic golfers of Malaysia
Golfers at the 2016 Summer Olympics
Golfers at the 2020 Summer Olympics
New Mexico Lobos men's golfers
Southeast Asian Games medalists in golf
Southeast Asian Games silver medalists for Malaysia
Southeast Asian Games bronze medalists for Malaysia
Competitors at the 2013 Southeast Asian Games
Malaysian people of Chinese descent
Malaysian people of Portuguese descent
Malaysian people of Irish descent
Sportspeople from Kuala Lumpur
1993 births
Living people